Sammy Reginald Johns (February 7, 1946 – January 4, 2013) was an American singer and songwriter, best known for his million-selling 1975 hit single, "Chevy Van".

Career
Johns was born in Charlotte, North Carolina. Johns' father gave him a guitar when he was nine, and he founded his first band (the Devilles) in his teenage years. The group performed locally and made a few records for Dixie Records. Johns moved to Atlanta, where he signed with General Recording in 1973. His first solo recording was "Early Morning Love" (1973).

"Chevy Van" (1975) reached No. 5 on the Billboard Hot 100 chart and remained in the chart for 17 weeks. It was awarded a gold disc by the R.I.A.A. on May 4, 1975. The titular song had been recorded in 1973, but was initially shelved and only released after 18 months with the album. It became very popular. The song sold about three million copies, and is credited for an increase in van sales the following year. In Canada, the song reached No. 7 in the RPM Magazine charts.

The song and an album led to a contract with Warner Curb Records to produce a soundtrack for the 1977 film The Van at the height of the Vansploitation genre. In an interview with WBT radio personality Keith Larson, Johns was paraphrased as saying "the song wasn't about a specific woman he met – but a compilation of events."

Johns switched to the Elektra label, where he issued singles such as "Common Man" and "Love Me off the Road". In his later career, he was mainly known as a composer rather than as a performer, as many covered versions of his songs became successful. John Conlee's cover version of "Common Man" reached number 1. Conlee made the song his theme song. Johns' songs have also been covered by Waylon Jennings, Sammy Kershaw, Conway Twitty (his final Billboard No. 1, "Desperado Love") and Fu Manchu. After Jennings sang Johns' song "America" at a celebration of the restoration of the Statue of Liberty in 1985, the single was nominated for country song of the year.

Death
Johns died on January 4, 2013, at Gaston Memorial Hospital in Gastonia, North Carolina, at the age of 66.

Discography

Albums

Singles

Quotes

References

External links
Interview with Sammy Johns
 
 
 

1946 births
2013 deaths
American male singer-songwriters
American country singer-songwriters
Writers from Charlotte, North Carolina
Musicians from Charlotte, North Carolina
Country musicians from North Carolina
Singer-songwriters from North Carolina